Malvern station is a train station at 200 E. First Street in Malvern, Arkansas. A former Missouri Pacific Railroad station, this  red brick depot was originally constructed in 1916.  Amtrak's Texas Eagle serves Malvern with one daily passenger train in each direction.  The station is unstaffed and, because trains stop on a flag stop basis, advance reservations are strongly recommended.

From 1876 to 1901, Malvern was the only junction point for rail passengers desiring to travel to Hot Springs National Park.  Passengers arriving on the St. Louis, Iron Mountain and Southern, a predecessor of Missouri Pacific Railroad, would transfer at Malvern to the trains of the Hot Springs Railroad.  The former roundhouse of the Hot Springs Railroad is located across the track from the Malvern Amtrak station.

Malvern is the closest Amtrak station for Hot Springs National Park, but it is now necessary to travel by automobile over the 20 miles between the two points.

See also

List of Amtrak stations

References

Hot Spring County Listings at the National Register of Historic Places

External links 

Amtrak Texas Eagle Stations - Malvern, AR
Malvern, AR Railroads
Malvern Amtrak Station (USA Rail Guide -- Train Web)

Amtrak stations in Arkansas
Malvern, Arkansas
Railway stations on the National Register of Historic Places in Arkansas
Buildings and structures in Malvern, Arkansas
Transportation in Hot Spring County, Arkansas
Railway stations in the United States opened in 1916
National Register of Historic Places in Hot Spring County, Arkansas
1916 establishments in Arkansas